Sufri Bolkiah ibni Omar Ali Saifuddien III (born 31 July 1951) is a member of the royal family of Brunei. He is the third son of Omar Ali Saifuddien III, the 28th Sultan of Brunei, and Raja Isteri (Queen) Pengiran Anak Damit. He is also the President of the Brunei Darussalam National Olympic Council (BDNOC) since 2010.

Early life and education
Prince Sufri Bolkiah was born on 31 July 1951 at Istana Darul Hana, Kampong Tumasek, Brunei Town. He is the third son of Sultan Omar Ali Saifuddien Sa'adul Khairi Waddien, the 28th Sultan of Brunei, and his wife, the late Suri Seri Begawan Raja Isteri Pengiran Anak Damit. Along with his siblings, Sufri Bolkiah had his early education at the Lapau (the Royal ceremonial building). He studied in Victoria Institution, Kuala Lumpur.

Career 
As the Head of Primal Corporation in August 1993, he was granted by authorities in Hanoi to invest up to US$9 million in oil and gas explorations in Vietnam over a 20-year period.

On 21 July 2010, Sufri Bolkiah was elected as the President of the Brunei Darussalam National Olympic Council (BDNOC). Representing the BDNOC on 12 February 2013, he together with his son 'Abdul Aleem, played in a "Charity for Nancy" futsal competition. The National Football Association of Brunei Darussalam (NFABD) and the Department of Youth and Sports collaborated to organize the four-day competition, which was completed yesterday. Tea Ai Seng, also known as Nancy, received B$2,400 from it to help with the cost of her treatment.

Personal life
It is claimed that he is suffering from a skin disorder. He has been married 4 times which are: Pengiran Anak Isteri Pengiran Anak Salma binti Pengiran Anak Muhammad Salleh (From 14 July 1971–1981), Dayang Hajjah Siti Ruhaizah binti Ibrahim (From 20 February 1982–1986), Hajah Mazuin binti Hamzah (From 11 February 1987–2003) and Pengiran Bini Hajah Faizah binti Dato Haji Nasir (Since 1999).

During the 1990 Commonwealth Games in Auckland, he participated in the Men's Shooting Clay Pigeon Trap and obtained 127 points, which puts him in last place. It was noted that he was unhappy with his shotgun during the competition.

Issue 
As of 26 January 2017, he has a total of 10 children which are:

Legacy

Titles 

 Since 1979:

Namesakes 

Sufri Bolkiah Secondary School, a secondary school in Tutong town, Tutong District
 Sufri Bolkiah Mosque, a mosque in Kampong Perpindanah Burong Pingai, Berakas 'A', Brunei-Muara District

Honours

National 
  Royal Family Order of the Crown of Brunei (DKMB)
  Order of Laila Utama (DK I) – Dato Laila Utama (1970)
  Order of Seri Utama (DK II) – Dato Seri Utama (1968)
  Sultan Hassanal Bolkiah Medal (PHBS) – (1 August 1968)
  Armed Forces Service Medal (PBLI)
  Meritorious Service Medal (PJK)

Foreign 
 :
  Order of the Crown of Johor Knight Grand Commander (SPMJ) – Dato' Sri Paduka
  Order of the Crown of Kelantan Knight Grand Commander (SPMK) – Dato'
  Royal Victorian Order Honorary Commander (CVO)

Ancestry

Notes 

Bruneian royalty
1951 births
Living people
Sufri
Sons of monarchs